Judo, for the 2013 World Combat Games, took place at the Saint Petersburg Sports and Concert Complex Hall 1 in Saint Petersburg, Russia, on the 19 and 20 October 2013.

Medal table
Key:

Medal summary

Men's team

Women's team

References

External links
Result book

2013
2013 World Combat Games events
World Combat Games
2013 World Combat Games